Mithat Pala (born 15 August 2000) is a Turkish professional footballer who plays as a midfielder for Çaykur Rizespor.

Professional career
Pala began his career at Pazarspor, and transferred to Çaykur Rizespor in January 2020, returning to Pazarspor on loan for the remainder of the 2019–20 season. Pala made his professional debut with Çaykur Rizespor in a 1-0 Turkish Cup loss to Beşiktaş on 13 January 2021.

References

External links
 
 

2000 births
Living people
Sportspeople from Adapazarı
Turkish footballers
Çaykur Rizespor footballers
Pazarspor footballers
Süper Lig players
Association football midfielders